Mark Campbell Ireland (born 5 April 1960) became the Archdeacon of Blackburn in 2016.

Ireland was educated at University of St Andrews and Wycliffe Hall Oxford; and ordained in  1985. He was a director of Saltmine Trust (company 02930528) from 2005 to 2008. After  curacies in Blackburn and Lancaster  he held incumbencies in Baxenden, Walsall  and Wellington with Eyton before his archdeacon's appointment.

He is a member of the General Synod of the Church of England. In relation to same-sex marriage, Ireland has stated: "I want to maintain the church's traditional doctrine of marriage, but also to belong to a church that truly welcomes and includes gay and lesbian people."

References

Archdeacons of Blackburn
1960 births
Living people
Alumni of the University of St Andrews
Alumni of Wycliffe Hall, Oxford
Members of the General Synod of the Church of England